Live on Brighton Beach is a live album by British big beat musician Fatboy Slim, released on 25 February 2002. It is a recording of a performance on Brighton Beach, England.

It reached number 19 in the UK Compilation Chart.

Track listing

Charts

References 

Fatboy Slim albums
Music in Brighton and Hove
2002 live albums